Coniferin is a glucoside of coniferyl alcohol. This white crystalline solid is a metabolite in conifers, serving as an intermediate in cell wall lignification, as well as having other biological roles. It can also be found in the water root extract of Angelica archangelica subsp. litoralis.

Vanillin was first synthesized from coniferin by chemists Ferdinand Tiemann and Wilhelm Haarmann.

References 

Monolignol glucosides